DE36 may refer to:
 Delaware Route 36
 ROCS Lu Shan (DE-36)
 
 DE 36, an automobile engine; see Daimler Straight-Eight engines